Septème is a commune in the Isère department in southeastern France.

History 
The name of Septème reflects its location: at the seventh milepost on the Roman road between Vienne and Milan. A Roman camp had been established here, on a hill overlooking the valley.

A castle was recorded here in the 11th century and the village developed next to it. During the second half of the 12th century, the site was encircled by a strong enceinte one kilometre in length with three gates. After the unification of Septème to Dauphiné, a more modern castle was constructed in the 14th and 15th centuries.

The village has grown beyond the original enceinte, and now extends as far as the river.

Population

Personalities
 Gabriel Veyre, born in Septême in 1871, pharmacist, operator of Lumière cinematograph, filmmaker and photographer of the Sultan of Morocco

See also
Communes of the Isère department

References

Communes of Isère
Isère communes articles needing translation from French Wikipedia